Joseph Dupont may refer to:
Joseph Dupont (bishop) (1850–1930), French missionary bishop to Zambia
Joseph Dupont (violinist) (1838–1899), Belgian violinist and conductor

See also
Dupont (disambiguation)